QF 12 pounder 12 cwt gun may refer to:

QF 12 pounder 12 cwt naval gun
QF 12 pounder 12 cwt AA gun